A block party is a neighbourhood festivity.

Block Party may refer to:

Arts and entertainment
"Block Party" (song), by Stacy Lattisaw and Johnny Gill, 1984
"The Block Party" (Lisa Lopes song), 2001
Block Party, an unreleased album by Missy Elliott
"Blockparty", a 2005 song by Dana Nălbaru
"Blockparty", a 2016 song by Miss Platnum
Dave Chappelle's Block Party, a 2005 documentary film
Block Party (2022 film), an American comedy film
CBS Block Party, a television programming block
Cartoon Network: Block Party, a Game Boy Advance video game
 Blockparty, a demoscene

Other uses 
 Block Party!, a robotics competition
 Block party, a prohibited debt collection practice under the Fair Debt Collection Practices Act
 BlockParty, software for Character Technical Directors

See also

Bloc party, a political party that is a constituent member of an electoral bloc
Bloc Party, an English rock band
Animation Block Party, a film festival in New York City, U.S.
Basilica Block Party, a music festival in Minneapolis, Minnesota, U.S.
Western Block Party, a Canadian political party